Boris Bandov (born November 23, 1953) is a Bosnian American retired soccer player who currently coaches youth soccer. Bandov spent ten seasons in the North American Soccer League, two in the Major Indoor Soccer League and one in the United Soccer League.  While born in Bosnia-Hercegovina, he became a U.S. citizen in 1976.  He earned thirty-three caps, scoring two goals, with the U.S. national team between 1976 and 1983.

Youth
Bandov was born in Livno, PR Bosnia and Herzegovina, FPR Yugoslavia. He attended Silver Creek High School in San Jose, California, where he played on the school's boys soccer team. In 1972, he led the team to California's Central Coast Section high school championship game, which the team lost to Archbishop Mitty High School. After graduating from high school, he briefly attended San Jose State, playing on the school's football team as a kicker. His longest was a 52-yard field goal in a game against Cal.

Professional
Bandov began his professional U.S. soccer career with the San Jose Earthquakes of the North American Soccer League on May 5, 1974. He played two seasons with the Earthquakes as a forward/midfield winger before moving to the Seattle Sounders after the 1975 season.  He spent most of 1976 on the Sounders reserve team, only making the first team after midfield winger Jimmy Robertson suffered a broken leg from a brutal tackle from Julio Navarro in a July 24, 1976 game against the Philadelphia Atoms.  Bandov played 5 games with the Sounders at the start of the 1977 season before moving to the Tampa Bay Rowdies for the remainder of the season. Though he saw limited playing time in just under two seasons in Tampa Bay, he was a reserve in the Rowdies' 3–1 loss to the Cosmos in Soccer Bowl '78.  In 1979 Bandov moved to the New York Cosmos.  He played with them through the end of the 1982 season, including the two NASL championship teams of 1980 and 1982 as well as the 1981 NASL championship loss to the Chicago Sting.  In 1983, the U.S. Soccer Federation, in coordination with the NASL, entered the U.S. national team, known as Team America, into the NASL as a league franchise.  The team drew on U.S. citizens playing in the NASL, Major Indoor Soccer League and American Soccer League.  In April 1983, Team America announced it had signed Bandov from the Cosmos on a game-by-game basis.  He played 21 games with the team during its single season in existence.  When Team America finished the 1983 season with a 10-20 record, the worst in the NASL, USSF withdrew the team from the league.  Bandov returned to the Cosmos, but was released on November 16, 1983, when Bandov refused to agree to a 20% pay cut.  In 1984, Bandov moved to the Fort Lauderdale Sun of the United Soccer League.  He continued to play for the Suns in 1985.  He retired in 1986 and lives in Dobbs Ferry with his wife, a former Miss Oregon.  He coaches for the FC Westchester U-17 boys and at various soccer camps and clinics.

National team
When Bandov became a U.S. citizen, he was almost immediately called into the national team for its first game of the year, a September 24 1978 FIFA World Cup qualifying game with Canada.  Bandov began his national team career with a bang, scoring the tying goal.  He went on to start every national team game in 1976, 1977, 1978, and 1979.  In 1980, his appearances began to taper off, but he still played the only U.S. games in 1982 and 1983.  The 1983 game, a 2-0 win over Haiti was his last with the team.  Despite playing a total of 33 games with the team, he scored only once again after his first game, in a meaningless 3-1 win over Bermuda in October 1979.

Coach
In 1988, he was hired as an assistant soccer coach with Manhattan College.

Honors
Soccer Bowl '80
Soccer Bowl '82
Soccer Bowl '78 (runner up)
Soccer Bowl '81 (runner up)
USL: 1984
USL Cup: 1985
Cosmopolitan Soccer League: 1986

References

External links
 
 NASL/MISL stats
 
 Tampa Bay Rowdies: Boris Bandov
 

1953 births
Living people
Sportspeople from Livno
American soccer coaches
American soccer players
College men's soccer coaches in the United States
Fort Lauderdale Sun players
Kansas City Comets (original MISL) players
Manhattan College people
North American Soccer League (1968–1984) indoor players
New York Cosmos players
North American Soccer League (1968–1984) players
San Jose Earthquakes (1974–1988) players
Seattle Sounders (1974–1983) players
Tampa Bay Rowdies (1975–1993) players
Team America (NASL) players
United Soccer League (1984–85) players
United States men's international soccer players
Yugoslav emigrants to the United States
Association football midfielders
Soccer players from San Jose, California